Ashes is a 1922 American silent drama film directed by Gilbert M. Anderson and starring William Courtleigh, Leona Anderson and Margaret Landis.

Cast
 William Courtleigh as 	Mr. DeCourcey
 Leona Anderson as 	Mrs. DeCourcey
 Margaret Landis as Madeline DeCourcey
 Myrtle Stedman as Mrs. Crafton
 Wedgwood Nowell as Mr. Crafton
 George Howard as Arthur Spencer
 Carrie Clark Ward as Mrs. Van Stuyhl
 Stanton Heck as Hotel Detective

References

Bibliography
 Connelly, Robert B. The Silents: Silent Feature Films, 1910-36, Volume 40, Issue 2. December Press, 1998.
 Munden, Kenneth White. The American Film Institute Catalog of Motion Pictures Produced in the United States, Part 1. University of California Press, 1997.

External links
 

1922 films
1922 drama films
1920s English-language films
American silent feature films
Silent American drama films
American black-and-white films
Films directed by Broncho Billy Anderson
1920s American films